Cyrtopodion golubevi  is a species of gecko, a lizard in the family Gekkonidae. The species is endemic to southeastern Iran.

Etymology
The specific name, golubevi, is in honor of Russian herpetologist Michael Leonidovich Golubev (1947–2005).

Geographic range
C. golubevi is found in southeastern Iran in the province of Sistan and Baluchestan.

References

Further reading
Nazarov, Roman A.; Ananjeva, Natalia B.; Rajabizadeh, Mehdi (2010). "Two New Species of Angular-Toed Geckoes (Squamata: Gekkonidae) from South Iran". Russian Journal of Herpetology 16 (4): 311-324. (Cyrtopodion golubevi, new species).

Cyrtopodion
Reptiles described in 2010